The Jordan River is a name given to two minor rivers in the South Island of New Zealand, one in Marlborough, the other in Tasman. Further south, there is also  stream in Otago named River Jordan.

The river in Marlborough flows from the northern flanks of the Inland Kaikoura Range into the Awatere River and lies within the borders of the Molesworth Station.

References

Rivers of Canterbury, New Zealand
Rivers of New Zealand